The 2015 Miami Open presented by Itaú (also known as 2015 Miami Masters) was a professional men and women's tennis tournament played on outdoor hard courts. It was the 31st edition of the Miami Masters, and was part of the Masters 1000 category on the 2015 ATP World Tour, and of the Premier Mandatory category on the 2015 WTA Tour. All men and women's events took place at the Tennis Center at Crandon Park in Key Biscayne, Florida, United States, from March 24 through April 5, 2015.

Points and prize money

Point distribution

 Players with byes receive first round points.

Prize money

ATP singles main-draw entrants

Seeds 

 1 Rankings are as of March 23, 2015.

Other entrants
The following players got wildcards into the singles main draw:
  Chung Hyeon 
  Kyle Edmund 
  Ryan Harrison 
  Thanasi Kokkinakis
  Andrey Rublev

The following players received entry using a protected ranking into the singles main draw:
  Nicolás Almagro
  Juan Martín del Potro

The following players received entry from the qualifying draw:
  Ruben Bemelmans
  Michael Berrer
  Steve Darcis
  James Duckworth
  Damir Džumhur
  Alejandro Falla
  Robin Haase 
  Austin Krajicek
  Filip Krajinović 
  Adrián Menéndez Maceiras
  Édouard Roger-Vasselin
  Alexander Zverev

Withdrawals
Before the tournament
  Julien Benneteau → replaced by  Borna Ćorić
  Marin Čilić → replaced by  Lleyton Hewitt
  Roger Federer (schedule change) → replaced by  Jarkko Nieminen
  Mardy Fish → replaced by  Tim Smyczek
  Richard Gasquet (back injury) → replaced by  Dušan Lajović
  Philipp Kohlschreiber → replaced by  Ričardas Berankis
  Nick Kyrgios (foot injury) → replaced by  Marinko Matosevic
  Andreas Seppi → replaced by  Go Soeda
  Radek Štěpánek → replaced by  Andrey Golubev
  Janko Tipsarević → replaced by  Jürgen Melzer

Retirements
  Dušan Lajović
  Lu Yen-hsun
  Gaël Monfils

ATP doubles main-draw entrants

Seeds 

1 Rankings as of March 23, 2015.

Other entrants
The following pairs received wildcards into the doubles main draw:
  Thomaz Bellucci /  João Souza
  Ryan Harrison /  Rajeev Ram

Retirements
  Roberto Bautista Agut (left eye injury)
  Marc López (ankle injury)

WTA singles main-draw entrants

Seeds 

 1 Rankings are as of March 9, 2015.

Other entrants
The following players got wildcards into the singles main draw:
  Françoise Abanda
  Paula Badosa Gibert
  Catherine Bellis 
  Sorana Cîrstea 
  Indy de Vroome  
  Daria Gavrilova
  Nicole Vaidišová 
  Natalia Vikhlyantseva

The following player received entry using a protected ranking into the singles main draw:
  Vera Zvonareva

The following players received entry from the qualifying draw:
  Tímea Babos 
  Alexandra Dulgheru
  Marina Erakovic
  Irina Falconi 
  Sesil Karatantcheva
  Kateryna Kozlova
  Tatjana Maria 
  Pauline Parmentier
  Urszula Radwańska
  Evgeniya Rodina 
  Alison Van Uytvanck 
  Stefanie Vögele

The following players received entry as a lucky loser:
  Zheng Saisai

Withdrawals
Before the tournament
  Timea Bacsinszky (left ankle injury) → replaced by  Aleksandra Krunić
  Dominika Cibulková (Achilles surgery) → replaced by  Polona Hercog
  Jarmila Gajdošová (bacterial infection) → replaced by  Kateřina Siniaková
  Petra Kvitová (exhaustion) → replaced by  Shelby Rogers
  Peng Shuai (back injury) → replaced by  Zheng Saisai

Retirements
  Marina Erakovic (left ankle injury)

WTA doubles main-draw entrants

Seeds 

1 Rankings as of March 9, 2015.

Other entrants
The following pairs received wildcards into the doubles main draw:
  Alizé Cornet /  Elina Svitolina
  Alexandra Dulgheru /  Simona Halep
  Daniela Hantuchová /  Karin Knapp
  Monica Puig /  Heather Watson

The following pairs received entry as alternates:
  Elena Bogdan /  Nicole Melichar
  Magdaléna Rybáriková /  Zheng Saisai

Withdrawals
Before the tournament
  Marina Erakovic (left ankle injury during first round singles match)
  Peng Shuai (back injury)

Champions

Men's singles

  Novak Djokovic defeated  Andy Murray, 7–6(7–3), 4–6, 6–0

Women's singles

  Serena Williams defeated  Carla Suárez Navarro, 6–2, 6–0

Men's doubles

  Bob Bryan /  Mike Bryan defeated  Vasek Pospisil /  Jack Sock, 6–3, 1–6, [10–8]

Women's doubles

  Martina Hingis /  Sania Mirza defeated  Ekaterina Makarova /  Elena Vesnina, 7–5, 6–1

References

External links